Mauricio Kuri González (born 9 May 1969) is a Mexican politician affiliated with the National Action Party party and current Governor of Querétaro. He previously served as mayor of Corregidora Municipality and as senator for Querétaro.

References

1969 births
Living people
21st-century Mexican politicians
Governors of Querétaro
Members of the Senate of the Republic (Mexico)
National Action Party (Mexico) politicians
Politicians from Veracruz
Senators of the LXIV and LXV Legislatures of Mexico